The South Carolina State Museum has four floors of permanent and changing exhibits, a digital dome planetarium (opened in 2014), 4D interactive theater and an observatory (both opened in 2014). The State Museum, is located along the banks of the Congaree River in downtown Columbia, South Carolina. It is the largest museum in the state, and is a Smithsonian Affiliate and part of the American Alliance of Museums. Positioned on an old shipping canal (Columbia Canal) that dates back to pre-Civil War times, the museum is widely recognized as a resource for South Carolina history and lifestyle. The museum opened on October 29, 1988, and is housed in what it calls its largest artifact, the former Columbia Mills Building, listed on the National Register of Historic Places in 1982. When the mill opened in 1894, manufacturing cotton duck cloth (a canvas-like material), it was the first totally electric textile mill in the world. It was also the first major industrial installation for the General Electric corporation. On certain levels of the museum, the original flooring has been kept intact, distinguishable by hundreds of textile brads and rings (that carried the threads during the spinning process) that became embedded in the floor while it was still being used as a mill. The South Carolina Confederate Relic Room & Military Museum is located within the Columbia Mills Building, and is the oldest museum exhibit (est. 1896) in Columbia.

The museum represents four disciplines: art, cultural history, science and technology, and natural history.  Exhibits include life-size replicas of the Best Friend of Charleston- the first American-built locomotive in 1830; and the Civil War's H.L. Hunley, the first submarine to sink an enemy ship in combat. The second floor on natural history is notable for its recreation of a 3.6-million-year-old megalodon, named Finn, suspended mid-air just around a corner, which has scared countless groups of young children, and for a life-size Columbian mammoth (which was once native to SC). There is also the Lipscomb art gallery on the first floor, which features an iron gate made by Charleston's Philip Simmons. And there is the Cotton Mill Exchange gift shop with South Carolina souvenirs and books. The museum has the Crescent Café with sandwiches. The museum has a 1989 mural of the nearby Gervais Street Bridge by Columbia's Blue Sky (artist) in a room next to the Café. It has topiary sculpted by Bishopville's Pearl Fryar in the parking lot. The Stringer Discovery Center for small children opened in 1997.

The museum has an "Official" Story Chair (named Sammy) designed and donated by Storyteller Mike Miller (greatstoryteller.com) for the benefit of children and storytellers.

Travelling exhibitions at the State Museum have included Body Worlds Vital in 2012, Titanic: the Artifact Exhibition (100 yr. anniversary) in '12, Secrets of the Maya in '12, King Tut in '13 and '03, Dinosaurs: A Bite Out of Time in '14, Julius Caesar: Roman Military Might in '15, "RACE: Are We So Different?" in '16, Savage Ancient Seas in '17, the 2017 Solar Eclipse in Columbia in the observatory, The Wizard of Oz in '17 for Halloweeen, Hall of Heroes (superheroes) in '19, 50 Years of the Apollo 11 Moon Landing (with items from SC astronaut Charles Duke) in '19, Sherlock Holmes: the International Exhibition in '20 (with items from the Museum of London), "Spanish Explorations in the Caribbean and the US, 1492-1570" (for the 500th anniversary of Columbus' discovery) in '90, WWII and SC in '91 (for 50 years since the Pearl Harbor attack), "Rock, Roll, and Remember: Hootie & the Blowfish and Other SC Greats" in '97, The World of Insects in '98, Star Trek: The Exhibition in '99, The Magic School Bus in '99, Inside Africa in '04, Prehistoric Predators in '04, Napoleon Bonaparte in '06, Aliens: Worlds of Possibilities in '07, Leonardo da Vinci in '08, an '08 exhibit on several of the movies (like The Patriot and Forrest Gump) filmed in SC ("Hollywood Comes to South Carolina"), "Football in the Palmetto State, 1889-2000" in '08, Pirates in 2010, and 150 years of the Civil War in SC in 2011.

References

External links 
South Carolina State Museum Website

Government buildings on the National Register of Historic Places in South Carolina
History of South Carolina
Museums in Columbia, South Carolina
Art museums and galleries in South Carolina
Science museums in South Carolina
History museums in South Carolina
Natural history museums in South Carolina
Museums established in 1988
1988 establishments in South Carolina
Industrial buildings and structures on the National Register of Historic Places in South Carolina
National Register of Historic Places in Columbia, South Carolina
Paleontology in South Carolina
Cotton mills in the United States